Johan Brunström and Jarkko Nieminen were the defending champions, but Nieminen decided not to participate.
Brunström played alongside Adil Shamasdin, but they were eliminated in the semifinals by Kas and Peya.

No.1 seeds František Čermák and Filip Polášek won the title beating No.2 seeds Christopher Kas and Alexander Peya in the final, 6–3, 7–6(9–7).

Seeds

Draw

Draw

References
 Main Draw

Credit Agricole Suisse Open Gstaad - Doubles
2011 Doubles
2011 Crédit Agricole Suisse Open Gstaad